George Henry Philips  (18 July 1831 – 22 October 1886) was an English first-class cricketer.

The son of Francis Aspinall Philips, he was born in July 1831 at Ardwick, Lancashire. He was educated at Eton College, before going up to Christ Church, Oxford in 1849. While studying at Oxford, he played first-class cricket for Oxford University Cricket Club on one occasion in 1853 against the Marylebone Cricket Club (MCC) at Oxford. Five years later he made a second appearance in first-class cricket, this time for the MCC against Oxford University at Oxford. For Oxford University he played as a wicket-keeper, taking one catch and making one stumping, while across both matches he scored 29 runs. He inherited Abbey Cwmhir Hall in Radnorshire from his father in 1859. The following year he was appointed High Sheriff of Radnorshire and later served as both a deputy lieutenant and justice of the peace for the county. Philips died at Abbey Cwmhir Hall in October 1886.

References

External links

1831 births
1886 deaths
People from Ardwick
Cricketers from Manchester
People educated at Eton College
Alumni of Christ Church, Oxford
English cricketers
Oxford University cricketers
Marylebone Cricket Club cricketers
High Sheriffs of Radnorshire
Deputy Lieutenants of Radnorshire
English justices of the peace